Princess Margaret Mountain is a mountain located in the Bow River valley of Banff National Park,  west of Mount Charles Stewart.

The mountain was named in 1958 after Princess Margaret (sister of Queen Elizabeth II), who had visited Banff and spent a night in a location near the mountain.


Geology
The mountain is composed of sedimentary rock laid down from the Precambrian to Jurassic periods. Formed in shallow seas, this sedimentary rock was pushed east and over the top of younger rock during the Laramide orogeny.

Climate
Based on the Köppen climate classification, it is located in a subarctic climate with cold, snowy winters, and mild summers. Temperatures in winter can drop below  with wind chill factors below . Weather conditions during summer months are optimum for climbing.

See also
Geology of Alberta

References

External links
 Parks Canada National Park Service web site: Banff National Park

Mountains of Banff National Park
Two-thousanders of Alberta